Spring green is a color that was traditionally considered to be on the yellow side of green, but in modern computer systems based on the RGB color model is halfway between cyan and green on the color wheel. 

The modern spring green, when plotted on the CIE chromaticity diagram, corresponds to a visual stimulus of about 505 nanometers on the visible spectrum.  In HSV color space, the expression of which is known as the RGB color wheel, spring green has a hue of 150°.  Spring green is one of the tertiary colors on the RGB color wheel, where it is the complementary color of rose.

The first recorded use of spring green as a color name in English was in 1766, referring to roughly the color now called spring bud.

Spring green (computer)

Spring green (HTML)

Spring green is a web color, common to X11 and HTML.

Medium spring green

Displayed at right is the color medium spring green.

Medium spring green is a web color. It is close to but not right on the color wheel and it is a little closer to cyan than to green.

Dark spring green

At right is displayed the web color dark spring green.

Additional variations of web spring green

Mint cream

Displayed at right is the web color mint cream, a pale pastel tint of spring green.

The color mint cream is a representation of the color of the interior of an after dinner mint (which is disc shaped with mint flavored buttercream on the inside and a chocolate coating on the outside).

Sea green 

Sea green is a shade of cyan color that resembles the hue of shallow seawater as seen from the surface.

Sea green is notable for being the emblematic color of the Levellers party in the politics of 1640s England. Leveller supporters would wear a sea-green ribbon, in a similar manner to the present-day red AIDS awareness ribbon.

Medium sea green

At right is displayed the web color medium sea green, a medium shade of spring green.

Aquamarine

Aquamarine is a color that is a pale bright tint of spring green toned toward cyan. It represents the color of the aquamarine gemstone. Aquamarine is the birthstone for those born on January 21 to February 20 in tropical zodiac, and February 14 to March 15 in sidereal zodiac.

Spring green (traditional)

Spring bud

Spring bud is the color that used to be called spring green before the X11 web color spring green was formulated in 1987 when the X11 colors were first promulgated.  This color is now called spring bud to avoid confusion with the web color.

The color is also called soft spring green, spring green (traditional), or spring green (M&P).

The first recorded use of spring green as a color name in English (meaning the color that is now called spring bud) was in 1766.

Additional variations of traditional  spring green

Emerald 

Emerald, also called emerald green, is a tone of green that is particularly light and bright, with a faint bluish cast. The name derives from the typical appearance of the emerald gemstone.

The first recorded use of emerald as a color name in English was in 1598.
Ireland is sometimes referred to as the Emerald Isle due to its lush greenery. The May birthstone is emerald. Seattle is sometimes referred to as the Emerald City, because its abundant rainfall creates lush vegetation. In the Middle Ages, The Emerald Tablet of Hermes Trismegistus was believed to contain the secrets of alchemy. "Emerald City", from the story of The Wonderful Wizard of Oz, by L. Frank Baum, is a city where everything from food to people are emerald green. However, it is revealed at the end of the story that everything in the city is normal colored, but the glasses everyone wears are emerald tinted. The Green Zone in Baghdad is sometimes ironically and cynically referred to as the Emerald City. The Emerald Buddha is a figurine of the sitting Buddha, made of green jade (rather than emerald), clothed in gold, and about 45 cm tall. It is kept in the Chapel of the Emerald Buddha (Wat Phra Kaew) on the grounds of the Grand Palace in Bangkok. The Emerald Triangle refers to the three counties of Mendocino, Humboldt, and Trinity in Northern California, United States because these three counties are the biggest marijuana producing counties in California and also the US. A county-commissioned study reports pot accounts for up to two-thirds of the economy of Mendocino. Emerald Cities: Urban Sustainability and Economic Development is a book published in 2010 by Joan Fitzgerald, director of the law, policy and society program at Northeastern University, about ecologically sustainable city planning.

Emerald was invented in Germany in 1814. By taking acetic acid, mixing and boiling it with vinegar, and then by adding some arsenic, a bright blue-green hue was formed. During the 19th century, the arsenic-containing dye Paris green was marketed as emerald green. It was notorious for causing deaths due to it being a popular color used for wallpaper. Victorian women used this bright color for dresses, and florists used it on fake flowers.

Viridian

At right is displayed the color viridian, a medium tone of spring green.

The first recorded use of viridian as a color name in English was in the 1860s (exact year uncertain).

Other variations of spring green

Green (CMYK) (pigment green) 

The color defined as green in the CMYK color system used in printing, also known as pigment green, is the tone of green that is achieved by mixing process (printer's) cyan and process (printer's) yellow in equal proportions. It is displayed at right.

The purpose of the CMYK color system is to provide the maximum possible gamut of color reproducible in printing.

The color indicated is only approximate as the colors of printing inks may vary.

Green (NCS) (psychological primary green) 

The color defined as green in the NCS or Natural Color System is shown at right (NCS 2060-G). The natural color system is a color system based on the four unique hues or psychological primary colors red, yellow, green, and blue. The NCS is based on the opponent process theory of vision.

The Natural Color System is widely used in Scandinavia.

Green (Munsell) 

The color defined as green in the Munsell color system (Munsell 5G) is shown at right. The Munsell color system is a color space that specifies colors based on three color dimensions: hue, value (lightness), and chroma (color purity), spaced uniformly in three dimensions in the elongated oval at an angle shaped Munsell color solid according to the logarithmic scale which governs human perception. In order for all the colors to be spaced uniformly, it was found necessary to use a color wheel with five primary colors—red, yellow, green, blue, and purple.

The Munsell colors displayed are only approximate as they have been adjusted to fit into the sRGB gamut.

Green (Pantone) 

Green (Pantone) is the color that is called green in Pantone.

The source of this color is the "Pantone Textile Paper eXtended (TPX)" color list, color # green C, EC, HC, PC, U, or UP—green.

Green (Crayola) 

Green (Crayola) is the color called green in Crayola crayons.

Green was one of the original Crayola crayons introduced in 1903.

Erin

At the right is displayed the color erin.
The first recorded use of erin as a color name was in 1922.

Bright mint

Displayed at right is the color bright mint.

Dark green 

Dark green is a dark shade of green. A different shade of green has been designated as "dark green (X11)" for certain computer uses.

Dark pastel green 

To the right is the color dark pastel green.

Screamin' green 

The color screamin' green is shown at right.

This color was renamed from ultra green by Crayola in 1990.

This color is a fluorescent color.

Cambridge blue

Cambridge blue is the color commonly used by sports teams from Cambridge University.

This color is actually a medium tone of spring green.  Spring green colors are colors with an h code (hue code) of between 135 and 165; this color has an h code of 140, putting it within the range of spring green colors on the RGB color wheel.

Caribbean green

At right is displayed the color Caribbean green. This is a Crayola color formulated in 1997.

Magic mint

At right is displayed the color magic mint, a light tint of spring green.

The color magic mint is a light tint of the color mint.

Ceramic tiles in a similar color, often with a contrasting black border, were a popular choice for bathroom, kitchen and upmarket hotel swimming pool décor during the 1930s.

This is a Crayola color formulated in 1990 (later retired in 2003).

Mint

The color mint, also known as mint leaf, is a representation of the color of mint.

The first recorded use of mint as a color name in English was in 1920.

Mountain meadow 

Displayed at right is the color mountain meadow.

Mountain meadow is a Crayola crayon color formulated in 1998.

Persian green 

Persian green  is a color used in pottery and Persian carpets in Iran.

Other colors associated with Persia include Persian red and Persian blue. It is a popular color in Iran because the color green symbolizes gardens, nature, heaven, and sanctity. The first recorded use of Persian green as a color name in English was in 1892.

Sea foam green 

This is the Crayola version of the above color, a much brighter and lighter shade. It was introduced in 2001.

Shamrock green (Irish green) 

Shamrock green is a tone of green that represents the color of shamrocks, a symbol of Ireland.

The first recorded use of shamrock as a color name in English was in the 1820s (exact year uncertain).

This green is also defined as Irish green Pantone 347.

This green is used as the green on the national flag of Ireland.

It is customary in Ireland, Australia, New Zealand, Canada, and the United States to wear this or any other tone of green on St. Patrick's Day, 17 March.

The State of California uses this shade of green of the grass under the bear on their state flag.

The Boston Celtics of the National Basketball Association use this shade for their uniforms, logos, and other memorabilia.

Sap green 

Sap green is a green pigment that was traditionally made of ripe buckthorn berries. However, modern colors marketed under this name are usually a blend of other pigments, commonly with a basis of Phthalocyanine Green G. Sap green paint was frequently used on Bob Ross's TV show, The Joy of Painting.

Jade 

Jade, also called jade green, is a representation of the color of the gemstone called jade, although the stone itself varies widely in hue.

The color name jade green was first used in Spanish in the form piedra de ijada in 1569.
The first recorded use of jade green as a color name in English was in 1892.

Malachite 

Malachite, also called malachite green, is a color that is a representation of the color of the mineral malachite.

The first recorded use of malachite green as a color name in English was in the 1200s (exact year uncertain).

Opal 

Displayed at right is the color opal.

It is a pale shade of cyan that is reminiscent of the color of an opal gemstone, although as with many gemstones, opals come in a wide variety of colors.

Brunswick green 

Brunswick green is a common name for green pigments made from copper compounds, although the name has also been used for other formulations that produce a similar hue, such as mixtures of chrome yellow and Prussian blue. The pigment is named after Braunschweig, Germany (also known as Brunswick in English) where it was first manufactured. It is a deep, dark green, which may vary from intense to very dark, almost black.

The first recorded use of Brunswick green as a color name in English was in 1764. Another name for this color is English green. The first use of English green as a synonym for Brunswick green was in 1923.

Deep Brunswick green is commonly recognized as part of the British racing green spectrum, the national auto racing color of the United Kingdom.

A different color, also called Brunswick green, was the color for passenger locomotives of the grouping and then the nationalized British Railways. There were three shades of these colors and they are defined under British Standard BS381C – 225, BS381C – 226, and BS381C – 227 (ordered from lightest to darkest). The Brunswick green used by the Nationalised British Railways – Western Region for passenger locomotives was BS381C – 227 (rgb(30:62:46)). RAL6005 is a close substitute to BS381C – 227. A characteristic of these colors was the ease for various railway locations to mix them by using whole pots of primary colors – hence the ability to get reasonably consistent colors with manual mixing half a century and more ago.

The color used by the Pennsylvania Railroad for locomotives was often called Brunswick green, but officially was termed dark green locomotive enamel (DGLE). This was a shade of green so dark as to be almost black, but which turned greener with age and weathering as the copper compounds further oxidized.

Castleton green 

Castleton green is one of the two official colors of Castleton University in Vermont. The official college colors are green (PMS 343) and white. The Castleton University Office of Marketing and Communications created the Castleton colors for web and logo development and has technical guidelines, copyright and privacy protection; as well as logos and images that developers are asked to follow in the college's guidelines for using official Castleton logos. If web developers are using green on a university website, they are encouraged to use Castleton green. It is prominently used for representing Castleton's athletic teams, the Castleton Spartans.

Bottle green 

Bottle green is a dark shade of green, similar to pine green. It is a representation of the color of green glass bottles.

The first recorded use of bottle green as a color name in English was in 1816.

Bottle green is a color in Prismacolor marker and pencil sets. It is also the color of the uniform of the Police Service of Northern Ireland replacing the Royal Ulster Constabulary's "rifle green" colored uniforms in 2001. It is also the green used in uniforms for South Sydney High School in Sydney.

Bottle green is also the color most associated with guide signs and street name signs in the United States.

Bottle green is also the background color of the Flag of Bangladesh, as defined by the government of Bangladesh. Another name for this color is Bangladesh green.

Dartmouth green 

Dartmouth green is the official color of Dartmouth College, adopted in 1866. It was chosen for being the only decent primary color that had not been taken already. It is prominently used as the name of the Dartmouth College athletic team, the Dartmouth Big Green. The Dartmouth athletic teams adopted this new name after the college officially discontinued the use of its unofficial mascot, the Dartmouth Indian, in 1974.

Dartmouth green and white are the main colors of Lithuanian basketball club Žalgiris Kaunas.

GO Transit green 

GO green was the color used for the brand of GO Transit, the regional commuter service in the Greater Toronto Area.

Between 1967 and 2013, the brand and color that has adorned each of its trains, buses, and other property generally remained unchanged. It also matched the shade of green used on signs for highways in Ontario. In July 2013, GO Transit updated its look to a two-tone color scheme.

Gotham green 

Gotham green is the official color of the New York Jets as of 4 April 2019. The name is a reference to one of the Nicknames of New York City.

Pakistan green 

Pakistan green is a shade of dark green, used in web development and graphic design. It is also the background color of the national flag of Pakistan. It is almost identical to the HTML/X11 dark green in sRGB and HSV values.

Sacramento State green 

In 2004, California State University, Sacramento rebranded itself as Sacramento State, while keeping the official name as the long form. In the process of rebranding a new logo was selected, and in 2005 it formalized the colors which it would use.

Paris green 

Paris green is a color that ranges from pale and vivid blue green to deeper true green. It comes from the inorganic compound copper (II) acetoarsenite and was once a popular pigment in artists' paints.

Spanish green 

Spanish green is the color that is called "verde" (the Spanish word for "green") in the Guía de coloraciones (Guide to colorations) by Rosa Gallego and Juan Carlos Sanz, a color dictionary published in 2005 that is widely popular in the Hispanophone realm.

UNT green 

UNT green is one of three official colors used by the University of North Texas. It is the primary color that appears on branding and promotional material produced by and on behalf of the university.

UP forest green 

At the right is one of the official colors used by the University of the Philippines, designated as "UP forest green". It is based on the approved color specifications to be used for the seal of the university.

Hooker's green 

Hooker's green is a dark green color created by mixing Prussian blue and gamboge. It is displayed on the right. Hooker's green takes its name from botanical artist William Hooker (1779–1832) who first created it particularly for illustrating leaves.

Aero blue

Aero blue is a fluorescent greenish-cyan color.  Aero blue was used as rainshower in one of the Sharpie permanent markers but not as bright on the marker. However, there is no mechanism for showing fluorescence on a computer screen.

Morning sky

Morning sky, also known as Morning blue is a representation of the color of the morning sky.

The year of the first recorded use of morning blue as a color name in English is unknown.

Feldgrau green

Feldgrau (field grey) was the color of the field uniform of the German Army from 1937 to 1945, and the East German NVA armies. Metaphorically, feldgrau used to refer to the armies of Germany (the Imperial German Army and the Heer [army] component of the Reichswehr and the Wehrmacht).

See also
 List of colors

References 

Tertiary colors
Shades of green
Shades of cyan